Milos Raonic defended his title, defeating unseeded Denis Istomin in straight sets in the final.

Seeds
The first four seeds received a bye into the second round.

Draw

Finals

Top half

Bottom half

Qualifying

Seeds

Qualifiers

Draw

First qualifier

Second qualifier

Third qualifier

Fourth qualifier

External links
 Main draw
 Qualifying draw

2012 ATP World Tour
2012 Singles
Singles